Daryl Campbell (born August 14, 1985), known professionally as Taxstone, is a television and Twitter personality and also a former rapper. He is primarily known for his Tax Season podcast on the Loud Speakers Network, as well as his Twitter presence. As a young man Tax became a member of the Bloods gang but now denounces any involvement.

Career
Taxstone was born as Daryl Campbell in East New York, Brooklyn, and he is of Afro-Honduran ancestry. He rose to prominence through Twitter, where he grew a large following for his bluntness and brazenness.

He caught the attention of The Loud Speakers Network's podcast hosts and on January 8, 2015 he appeared on an episode of Charlamagne Tha God and Andrew Schulz's The Brilliant Idiots podcast. Another podcast host on the network, Kid Fury, had also recommended him to the network's bosses Combat Jack and Chris Morrow which led him to land his own podcast Tax Season. He released the first episode of Tax Season on The Loud Speakers Network on March 18, 2015, just four months after he was first recommended to the network by Kid Fury.

Arrest
On 16 January 2017, Campbell was arrested in connection to the shooting death of Ronald "Banga" McPhatter. McPhatter was working at the time as the bodyguard for rapper Roland Collins (Troy Ave.) at an Irving Plaza concert for fellow rapper Clifford Joseph Harris Jr. (T.I.)  Campbell was indicted on charges of being a felon in possession of a firearm and receiving a gun through interstate commerce. Authorities allege that Campbell's DNA was found on the trigger, hand grip and magazine of the 9-millimeter Kel-Tec semiautomatic handgun that was used in the shooting in the venue's green room.

References

Living people
American people of Honduran descent
American people of Jamaican descent
1985 births
People from East New York, Brooklyn